Bivand-e Olya (also Romanized as Bīvand-e ‘Olyā) is a village in Sharwineh Rural District, Kalashi District, Javanrud County, Kermanshah Province, Iran. At the 2006 census, its population was 224, in 45 families.

References 

Populated places in Javanrud County